Qusay Muneer Abboodi Al-Hussein (born 12 April 1981 in Iraq) is a former footballer and currently head coach of Al-Diwaniya. Prior to his managerial career Muneer was an acclaimed central midfielder with more than 80 caps for the Iraqi National Team, winning the 2007 Asian Cup. Muneer was a well recognised player in the middle east, having played for clubs in Qatar, Saudi Arabia, and the United Arab Emirates.

Career
Qusay Muneer has been one of the revelations after the war, the former attacker turned midfield enforcer had been on the fringes of the Olympic team before the war until Adnan Hamad gave him a chance and handed the 22-year-old player his debut against Syria, Qusay replied with a goal in a convincing 3–1 victory, and has since earned himself a regular place in midfield despite getting himself sent-off only few minutes after scoring the equaliser against Fajr Sepasi F.C. at the 2003 Emir Abdullah Al-Faisal in Abha, Saudi Arabia. Qusay later scored the all-important fourth goal in the 4–1 win over North Korea in Amman; which gave Iraq a place in the last round of the Olympic qualifiers. Shortly after his goal; Qusay was handed his first international call-up by Bernd Stange and took part in Iraq's tour of Australia in Perth and Albany, and came on as a substitute in the first 20 minutes after an injury to Haitham Khadim.

Before his inclusion in the Olympic team, Qusay had been playing as a centre forward for Al-Sinaa, in the Iraqi first division, netting six times, and scoring twice more in the Iraqi Cup during the 2002/2003 season before the league was suspended due to the outbreak of war. In March 2003, he moved to the Air Force Club, Al-Quwa Al-Jawiya, at the end of the war and was praised for his impressive performances in the Iraqi league and the AFC Champions League. Qusay played a short term in Saudi Arabia for Al-Hazem then went to Qatar for Al-Khor before he suffered a serious injury in 2006 cost him 1 year of his professional career, he recovered in 2007 and signed for Arbil FC and in the same year he won the Iraqi League, Qusay called for the 2007 Asian Cup campaign and was part of the Asian Cup champions squad, after the Asian Cup Qusay signed for 1-year contract with the Emirati Club Al-Sharjah.

Managerial career
Qusay Muneer started working towards becoming a football coach shortly after retiring, he obtained his s level C coaching certificate from the AFC in November 2016. He got his first job as a manager when he was appointed by Iraqi second division side Al Diwaniyah in March 2017. Qusay impressed in his first stint and finished the season undefeated, winning the Iraqi Division one title and qualifying to the Iraqi Premier League. He resigned shortly after winning promotion due to "infighting within the management" He is Currently the head coach of Al-Sinaa

International goals
Scores and results list Iraq's goal tally first.

Managerial statistics

Honours

Player

Club
Erbil
Iraqi Premier League: 2006–07

Qatar SC
Qatar Crown Prince Cup: 2009
GCC Champions League runner-up: 2009-10

International
Asian Cup: 2007
West Asian Games: 2005

Manager
Al-Diwaniya
Iraq Division One: 2016–17

Notes

External links
Official website 

Qusay Munir on Iraqsport.com

1981 births
Living people
Iraqi footballers
Iraq international footballers
Olympic footballers of Iraq
2004 AFC Asian Cup players
Footballers at the 2004 Summer Olympics
2007 AFC Asian Cup players
2011 AFC Asian Cup players
AFC Asian Cup-winning players
Iraqi expatriate footballers
Al-Khor SC players
People from Nasiriyah
Sharjah FC players
Expatriate footballers in Qatar
Qatar SC players
Qatar Stars League players
Al-Hazem F.C. players
Amanat Baghdad players
UAE Pro League players
Iraqi expatriate sportspeople in Qatar
Association football midfielders
Al-Shorta SC players
Saudi Professional League players
Expatriate footballers in Saudi Arabia
Iraqi expatriate sportspeople in Saudi Arabia